is a Japanese video game published in 1998 for the Sega Saturn system. It was subsequently ported to PC under the title .

The story is set in the Dharma Kingdom, and involves the theft of a jewel. Clues must be sought after in dungeons, castles, and towns, until the true culprit is found.

Development 
The game was illustrated by Sugiyama Genshō. It was based on a 1996 audio drama of the same name. The game was developed by AIC Spirits and Increment P Corp.

Gameplay 
Princess Quest is an action role playing game.

While the gameplay can be described as a classic turn-based role-playing video game, the main focus of the game is on interacting with the non-player characters and discovering what they are up to. 

Princess Quest features several short anime video clips, as well as spoken dialog (in Japanese) throughout the game.

Story 

Five princesses from surrounding kingdoms are visiting , but young Prince Tapioca isn't showing much interest. Meanwhile, someone makes off with a valuable item. Queen Madeleine hires a young swordsman named Willow to investigate the theft. Using this disguise, Willow tries to gain the trust of the princesses, in hopes of determining who is responsible for the theft.

Cast
 - The young hero who comes to Granmalnie Castle. Voiced by: 
 - Willow's female form. Voice actor: Yoko Asada (浅田 葉子)
 - A cabbit who takes the form of a bracelet which effects Willow's magical transformation. Voiced by: Rei Sakuma (佐久間 レイ)
 - King of Dilma. Voiced by: Kiyoshi Kawakubo (川久保 潔)
 - Queen of Dilma. Voiced by: Masako Katsuki (勝生 真沙子)
 - Prince of Dilma. Voiced by: Emi Shinohara (篠原 恵美)
 - Princess of Rarian. Voiced by: Sakura Tange (丹下 桜)
  - Princess of Northland. Voiced by: Yuri Shiratori (白鳥 由里)
 - Princess of Soodaresu. Voiced by: Mifuyu Hiiragi (柊 美冬)
 - Princess of Rouresu. Voiced by: Ai Orikasa (折笠 愛)
 - Princess of Gimuria. Voiced by: Kikuko Inoue (井上 喜久子)

Release 
Princess Quest was released on March 19th, 1998 for the Sega Saturn console in Japan. It was the re-released for the PC under the title Princess Quest R.

Reception 
Upon release, four reviewers from Famitsu gave it a score of 21 out of 40.

References

1998 video games
Role-playing video games
Windows games

Japan-exclusive video games
Sega Saturn games
Video games developed in Japan